Lois Adrienne Salamonsen  is an expert in uterine and endometrium biology. Her research focuses on the mechanisms underlying endometrial remodelling. She is a Fellow of the Australian Academy of Science.

Education and Career 
Professor Salamonsen studied biochemistry and received her bachelor's degree with first class honours from the University of Otago. At the beginning of her career in reproductive biology, she worked as a research assistant with Prof. Henry Burger and Dr James Goding Sr at Prince Henry's Institute of Medical Research and pioneered  a radioimmunoassay for ovine Follicle-stimulating hormone (FSH) that allowed tracking of its release. She earned her Ph.D. in Reproductive Biology from Monash University in 1987. Prof. Salamonsen started her independent laboratory at Prince Henry's Institute of Medical Research, which later merged with Monash Institute of Medical Research to become the Hudson Institute of Medical Research, and was the inaugural Head of Centre for Reproductive Health from 2014 to 2016.

Awards and honours 

 Fellow and Life Member, Society for Reproductive Biology
 President, Society for Reproductive Biology (2004-2006)
 Founder's Lecture, Society for Reproductive Biology (2009)
 Honorary Fellow, Royal Australian and New Zealand College of Obstetricians and Gynaecologists (2012)
 Fellow, Society for the Study of Reproduction (2014)
 Beacon Award from Frontiers in Reproduction Research Program (for distinguished guidance in developing young scient1sts (2014)
 Fellow, Australian Academy of Science (2017)
 Lifetime Achievement Award, Monash University Faculty of Medicine Nursing and Health Sciences (2019)

References 

Australian biologists
Australian women scientists
Women endocrinologists
Fellows of the Australian Academy of Science
Year of birth missing (living people)
Living people